Ivan Jakov Džoni (born 25 July 1994) is a Croatian football forward who currently plays for Sloga Mravince.

He is the son of Vilson Džoni, a former Hajduk player.

Club career
Ivan Džoni joined Croatian football giants Hajduk Split's youth academy in 2005, aged only 12 years old. Throughout his years at Hajduk's youth academy, he was hailed as the new big thing. In the 2010/11 and 2011/12 seasons, he joined the club's senior team in their pre-season preparations.
In the summer of 2011, English club Manchester City gave the youngster a 10-day trial at the club.

On 17 May 2013 he made his league debut for Hajduk in a 1-0 victory against NK Osijek. On 2 August 2015 Hajduk terminated his contract.

In February 2019, Džoni joined NK Junak Sinj.

Tampines Rovers 
Dzoni signed for Tampines on 3 January 2017 for the 2017 S.League season. Dzoni made his league debut for Tampines in the 2017 Charity Shield, which doubles up as the league season's opener, in a 1-2 defeat for the Stags. He made a goal but missed a penalty after it was ordered to be retaken. He got his first league goal after successfully converting from the spot kick in the second game against Hougang United, to help the Stags get their first win of the season.

He got the stags back to winning ways, after a mid week 5-0 loss to Filipino side Ceres–Negros F.C. in the AFC Cup, by scoring the only goal in a 1-0 win over Balestier Khalsa FC in match day 3 of the 2017 S.League season. He, however, missed his 2nd penalty in 3 league games after Balestier goalkeeper Zaiful Nizam went the correct way.

References

External links

1994 births
Living people
Footballers from Split, Croatia
Croatian people of Albanian descent 
Croatian people of Kosovan descent
Association football forwards
Croatian footballers
Croatia youth international footballers
HNK Hajduk Split players
HNK Hajduk Split II players
HNK Cibalia players
NK Dugopolje players
NK Rudeš players
FK Dukla Banská Bystrica players
Tampines Rovers FC players
NK Imotski players
NK Solin players
NK Junak Sinj players
RNK Split players
Croatian Football League players
First Football League (Croatia) players
2. Liga (Slovakia) players
Singapore Premier League players
Croatian expatriate footballers
Expatriate footballers in Slovakia
Croatian expatriate sportspeople in Slovakia
Expatriate footballers in Singapore
Croatian expatriate sportspeople in Singapore